A value network is a graphical illustration of social and technical resources within/between organizations and how they are utilized. The nodes in a value network represent people or, more abstractly, roles. The nodes are connected by interactions that represent deliverables. These deliverables can be objects, knowledge or money. Value networks record interdependence. They account for the worth of products and services. Companies have both internal and external value networks.

Types 
External networks include customers/recipients, intermediaries, stakeholders, complementary, open innovation networks and suppliers.

Internal networks focus on key activities, processes and relationships that cut across internal boundaries, such as order fulfillment, innovation, lead processing and customer support. Value is created through exchange and the relationships between roles.

Definition 
Christensen defines value network as:
"The collection of upstream suppliers, downstream channels to market, and ancillary providers that support a common business model within an industry. When would-be disruptors enter into existing value networks, they must adapt their business models to conform to the value network and therefore fail at disruption because they become co-opted."

Value configuration 
Fjeldstad and Stabell declare a value network as one of three ways by which an organisation generates value. The others are the value shop and value chain.

Their value networks consist of these components:
 customers
 a service that enables interaction among them
 an organization to provide the service.
 contracts that enable access to the service

One example of a value network is that formed by social media users. The company provides a service, users contract with the company and immediately have access to the value network of other customers.

A less obvious example is a car insurance company: The company provides insurance. Customers can travel and interact in various ways while limiting risk exposure. The insurance policies represent the company's contracts and the internal processes.

F/S and Christensen's concepts address how a company understands itself and its value creation process, but they are not identical. Christensen's value networks address the relation between a company and its suppliers and the requirements posed by the customers, and how these interact when defining what represents value
in the product that is produced.

Fjeldstad and Stabell's value networks emphasize that the created value is between interacting customers, as facilitated by value networks.

Value constellations 
Normann and Ramirez argued in 1993 that strategy is not a fixed set of activities along a value chain. Instead the focus should be on the value creating system. All stakeholders are obligated to produce value. Successful companies conceive of strategy as systematic social innovation.

Verna Allee 
Verna Allee defines value networks as any web of relationships that generates both tangible and intangible value through complex dynamic exchanges between two or more individuals, groups or organizations. Any organization or group of organizations engaged in both tangible and intangible exchanges can be viewed as a value network, whether private industry, government or public sector.

Allee developed Value network analysis, a whole systems mapping and analysis approach to understanding tangible and intangible value creation among participants in an enterprise system. Revealing the hidden network patterns behind business processes can provide predictive intelligence for when workflow performance is at risk. She believes value network analysis provides a standard way to define, map and analyse the participants, transactions and tangible and intangible deliverables that together form a value network. Allee says, value network analysis can lead to profound shifts in perception of problem situations and mobilise collective action to implement change

Important terms and concepts

Tangible value 
All exchanges of goods, services or revenue, including all transactions involving contracts, invoices, return receipt of orders, request for proposals, confirmations and payment are considered to be tangible value. Products or services that generate revenue or are expected as part of a service are also included in the tangible value flow of goods, services, and revenue (2). In government agencies these would be mandated activities. In civil society organizations these would be formal commitments to provide resources or services.

Intangible value 
Two primary subcategories are included in intangible value: knowledge and benefits. Intangible knowledge exchanges include strategic information, planning knowledge, process knowledge, technical know-how, collaborative design and policy development; which support the product and service tangible value network. Intangible benefits are also considered favors that can be offered from one person to another. Examples include offering political or emotional support to someone. Another example of intangible value is when a research organization asks someone to volunteer their time and expertise to a project in exchange for the intangible benefit of prestige by affiliation (3).

All biological organisms, including humans, function in a self-organizing mode internally and externally. That is, the elements in our bodies—down to individual cells and DNA molecules—work together in order to sustain us. However, there is no central "boss" to control this dynamic activity. Our relationships with other individuals also progress through the same circular free flowing process as we search for outcomes that are best for our well-being. Under the right conditions these social exchanges can be extraordinarily altruistic. Conversely, they can also be quite self-centered and even violent. It all depends on the context of the immediate environment and the people involved.

A non-linear approach 
Often value networks are considered to consist of groups of companies working together to produce and transport a product to the customer. Relationships among customers of a single company are examples of how value networks can be found in any organization. Companies can link their customers together by direct methods like the telephone or indirect methods like combining customer's resources together.

The purpose of value networks is to create the most benefit for the people involved in the network (5). The intangible value of knowledge within these networks is just as important as a monetary value. In order to succeed knowledge must be shared to create the best situations or opportunities. Value networks are how ideas flow into the market and to the people that need to hear them.

Because value networks are instrumental in advancing business and institutional practices a value network analysis can be useful in a wide variety of business situations. Some typical ones are listed below.

Relationship management 
Relationship management typically just focuses on managing information about customers, suppliers, and business partners. A value network approach considers relationships as two-way value-creating interactions, which focus on realizing value as well as providing value.

Business web and ecosystem development 
Resource deployment, delivery, market innovation, knowledge sharing, and time-to-market advantage are dependent on the quality, coherence, and vitality of the relevant value networks, business webs and business ecosystems.

Fast-track complex process redesign 
Product and service offerings are constantly changing – and so are the processes to innovate, design, manufacture, and deliver them. Multiple, inter-dependent, and concurrent processes are too complex for traditional process mapping, but can be analyzed very quickly with the value network method.

Reconfiguring the organization 
Mergers, acquisitions, downsizing, expansion to new markets, new product groups, new partners, new roles and functions – anytime relationships change, value interactions and flows change too.

Supporting knowledge networks and communities of practice 
Understanding the transactional dynamics is vital for purposeful networks of all kinds, including networks and communities focused on creating knowledge value. A value network analysis helps communities of practice negotiate for resources and demonstrate their value to different groups within the organization.

Develop scorecards, conduct ROI and cost/benefit analyses, and drive decision making 
Because the value network approach addresses both financial and non-financial assets and exchanges, it expands metrics and indexes beyond the lagging indicators of financial return and operational performance – to also include leading indicators for strategic capability and system optimization.

See also 

 Creativity techniques
 Complexity science
 Value (economics)
 Value conversion
 Value network analysis

References

External links 
 NetLab- at the University of Toronto, studies the intersection of social, communication, information and computing networks.
 Value Network Analysis and Value Conversion of Tangible and Intangible Assets, Verna Allee.
 CASOS – Center for Computational Analysis of Social and Organizational Systems at Carnegie Mellon.

Value proposition
Social networks